Alcides de Souza Faria Júnior, or simply Cidinho (born 28 January 1993) is a Brazilian midfielder.

He was a member of Brazil national under-23 football team in Pan American Games on 2011.

Club career
Born in Rio de Janeiro, Cidinho started his youth football career in 2001 where he joined Botafogo. He played in all age-levels in Botafogo until 2011.

On 2011 he could play for Botafogo in Campeonato Brasileiro Série A. He played 28 matches in Série A and scored 4 goals. Moreover, from 2013 to 2015 he played for Botafogo in Campeonato Carioca and Copa do Brasil.

In the international level, Cidinho also got a chance to play for Botafogo in Copa Sudamericana in 2012 and Copa Libertadores in 2014.

In 2017, he joined French club AS Béziers. He left Béziers in the summer 2019. At the end of December 2019, Cidinho signed with Thai League 2 club, Air Force United, who was renamed Uthai Thani F.C. for the 2020 season. However, after difficulties adapting, he left the club after three months and returned to France.

Brazil U20 and U23 national teams
On 2010 and from Botafogo U20 he could reach Brazil national under-20 football team. He played 19 matches for the Brazil U20 national team and scored 3 goals from 2010 to 2012.

On 2011 and after strong performance in Campeonato Brasileiro Série A with Botafogo, he invited to Brazil national under-23 football team for competing in 2011 Pan American Games held in Guadalajara, Mexico.

In the competition, he played 2 matches for Brazil U23 national team against Argentina and Costa Rica.

Honours
Botafogo
 Campeonato Brasileiro Série A fourth place: 2013
 Campeonato Brasileiro Série B: 2015
 Campeonato Carioca: 2013, runners-up: 2012, 2015, 2016

References

External links

1993 births
Living people
Footballers from Rio de Janeiro (city)
Brazilian footballers
Association football midfielders
Brazilian expatriate footballers
Botafogo de Futebol e Regatas players
Associação Académica de Coimbra – O.A.F. players
AS Béziers (2007) players
Campeonato Brasileiro Série A players
Campeonato Brasileiro Série B players
Championnat National players
Ligue 2 players
Brazilian expatriate sportspeople in France
Brazilian expatriate sportspeople in Thailand
Expatriate footballers in France
Expatriate footballers in Thailand